Manuele Celio (born June 9, 1966) is a Swiss former professional ice hockey player. He is currently the head coach of the Switzerland men's national junior ice hockey team at the 2012 World Junior Ice Hockey Championships.

Celio competed with the Switzerland men's national ice hockey team at both the 1988 and 1992 Winter Olympic Games, and also at the 1987, 1991, 1992, and 1993 Men's World Ice Hockey Championships.

References

External links

1966 births
Living people
HC Ambrì-Piotta players
EHC Kloten players
Swiss ice hockey left wingers
Olympic ice hockey players of Switzerland
Ice hockey players at the 1988 Winter Olympics
Ice hockey players at the 1992 Winter Olympics